Live & Direct may refer to:

 Live & Direct (P Money album), 2016
 Live & Direct (Starflam album), 2000
 Live & Direct (Taj Mahal album), 1979
 Liveandirect, a 1989 album by Adamski
 Live + Direct, a 2002 album by Renaissance